Healy Baumgardner (born October 10, 1979) is an American political advisor who advised Donald Trump in his 2016 presidential campaign.

Early life and career
Born in Glen Dale, West Virginia, Healy E. Baumgardner grew up at the intersection of Republican politics and the private sector. Her father, the late Mayor Robert E. Baumgardner, was the trusted confidante and political ally of West Virginia Governor Arch Moore. Moore was convicted in 1990 on widespread corruption charges, including accepting $100,000 in illegal contributions and extorting $573,000 from a coal executive in return for $2.3 million in reimbursement from the state's black lung compensation program. The father of current U.S. Senator Shelley Moore Capito, Moore had his law license revoked and served three years in prison before his release in 1993.

Career

Baumgardner has advised four presidential campaigns. In this role, Baumgardner served as a senior communications adviser and spokesperson, becoming one of the most public and ridiculed campaign surrogates on television.

Prior to her involvement with Trump, she served as deputy communications director for Rudy Giuliani's 2008 presidential campaign. Although Giuliani initially led the national polls, he dropped out after the Florida primary.  She also served as a senior White House press official and spokesperson for the Department of Energy in George W. Bush's administration. She had to manage groups of more than 200 people, consisting of personnel from, among others, U.S. embassies, the U.S. Department of State, and the White House. Baumgardner is one of the few political operatives who has served in both the 9/11 White House and for the 9/11 Mayor.

Baumgardner has appeared on numerous media on behalf of many clients, including the White House, the Department of Energy, presidential candidates, heads of state, public figures, and has campaigned for many critical issues.

Like many former Trump campaign staffers, Baumgardner capitalized on her connections by forming 45 Energy Group. To date, this lobbying group has collected $250,000 from the government of Malaysia to arrange meetings between officials and $425,000 from a foreign group seeking support for an Uzbekistan ethane/methane project. The latter project became a focal point in President Donald Trump's impeachment inquiry. Businessman Lev Parnas had recruited Baumgardner and Rudy Giuliani, the latter to create the perception that Trump lent his support. Giuliani planned to visit Uzbekistan in May 2019, but after Baumgardner learned the foreign group had ties with the Chinese government, the trip was canceled; if it had proceeded, the two of them could have been required to register as foreign agents. As part of their inquiry into the Trump administration's dealings in Ukraine, the House Intelligence, Foreign Affairs, and Oversight and Reform Committees subpoenaed Giuliani for documents relating to the Uzbekistan project. Baumgardner claimed the 45 Group was acting legally and ethically, criticizing House Democrats for “unfairly targeting and harassing private citizens, like myself.”

Coronavirus diagnosis
Baumgardner attended Donald Trump's 2020 Election Day party at the White House as a guest of Rudy Giuliani. On November 11, 2020, Bloomberg News reported that she had tested positive for COVID-19, as had several others who attended.

References

This is poorly written

American women in business
American political consultants
1979 births
Living people
21st-century American women